The Indian 20 coin is a former denomination of the Indian rupee. The 20 Paise coin equals  of a rupee.

References

Historical currencies of India
Coins of India